Muguga is a settlement in Kenya's Kiambu County, formerly in Central Province.

It is the location of a Veterinary Research Centre.

Economy 
Spencon had a headquarters in Muguga. The offices were in prefabricated buildings formerly used as workshops. The property also had a golf facility installed after July 2015. The headquarters moved there in 2015 as a cost-cutting measure, away from Rahimtulla Tower in Upper Hill, Nairobi.

References 

Populated places in Central Province (Kenya)